Max Charles Freedman ( Friedman; January 8, 1893 – October 8, 1962) was an American songwriter and lyricist, best remembered for co-writing the song "Rock Around the Clock" .

Background

Freedman was born in Philadelphia, and became a radio announcer, writer and entertainer, before joining the staff of a music publishing company.  He joined ASCAP in 1942.  One of his first successes as a writer, credited as Ray Freedman, was "Sioux City Sue", a hit record for the song's co-writer Dick Thomas in 1945, and later recorded by many others including Gene Autry, Bing Crosby, Bob Wills and Willie Nelson.  His other successful songs, several of which were written with Morty Berk and Frank Capano, included "Dreamy Old New England Moon", "Heartbreaker" (1947), and "Tea Leaves" (1948).

Freedman co-wrote the words and music to the landmark song "Rock Around the Clock" with "Jimmy DeKnight", a pseudonym used by composer, music publisher, and promoter James E. Myers. The song was copyrighted on March 31, 1953, although there is evidence that it was written in 1952. There are also claims that Freedman wrote the song in its entirety.

Although Bill Haley & His Comets were supposed to be the first to record it, a dispute between Myers and Dave Miller, the owner of Essex Records, prevented Haley from doing so. The first recording of the song was made by an Italian-American novelty group, Sonny Dae & His Knights. Haley finally recorded it in 1954 for Decca Records and in 1955, the song became a no. 1 record, one of the first of the rock and roll era.

Freedman died in 1962 at the age of 69.

References

Sources
 Dawson, Jim. Rock Around the Clock: The Record that Started the Rock Revolution. Backbeat Books, 2005. 
 John Swenson. Bill Haley. London: W.H. Allen, 1982. 
 Haley, John W. and John von Hoelle. Sound and Glory. Dyne-American, 1990. 

1893 births
1962 deaths
Songwriters from Pennsylvania
Bill Haley
Musicians from Philadelphia